Communist Party of Madrid (in Spanish: Partido Comunista de Madrid), is the federation of the Communist Party of Spain (PCE) in the Community of Madrid.

External links
PCM website

Madrid
Political parties in the Community of Madrid
Political parties with year of establishment missing